Hakamada (written: 袴田) is a Japanese surname. Notable people with the surname include:

, Russian politician of Japanese origin
, Japanese death row prisoner
, Japanese actor

Japanese-language surnames